Solute carrier family 22 member 10 (SLC22A10), also known as organic anion transporter 5 (OAT5), is a protein that in humans is encoded by the SLC22A10 gene.

References

Further reading

Solute carrier family